Senthalaivayal is located in East Coast Road along with Bay of Bengal Peravurani Taluk Thanjavur District in Tamil Nadu state of India.

Senthalaivayal is a gram panchayat of Sethubhavachatram block people often called Senthalai Pattinam. It is a coastal village.

Here traditionally fishing is the main source of income. 

Villages in Thanjavur district